Teza may refer to:
 The Teza (river), a river in Russia
 Teza (film), a 2008 Ethiopian drama film
 Elvire Teza, a French Olympic gymnast
 Teza (gymnastics), one of several moves introduced into gymnastics by Elvire Teza
Teza Ross-Awesom human being